Neapolitan ragù (known in Neapolitan as  and Italian as   or ragù napoletano) is one of the two most famous varieties of meat sauces called ragù. It is a speciality of Naples, as its name indicates. The other variety originated in Bologna and is known in Italian as ragù bolognese or ragù alla bolognese.

The Neapolitan type is made from two main parts: meat, and tomato sauce to which a few seasonings are added. However, a major difference is how the meat is used, as well as the amount of tomato in the sauce. Bolognese versions use very finely chopped meat, while Neapolitan versions use whole meat, taking it from the casserole when cooked and serving it as a second course or with pasta. Preferences for ingredients also differ. In Naples, white wine is replaced by red wine, butter by lard or olive oil, and many basil leaves are used where Bolognese ragù has no herbs. In the Neapolitan recipe, the content may well be enriched by adding raisins, pine nuts, and involtini with different fillings. Milk and cream are not used, and a relative abundance of tomato sauce is preferred, in contrast to Bolognese use of a minimal amount. The tomato season is much longer in more southern Naples than in more northern Bologna. Like the Bolognese, Neapolitan ragù also has quite a wide range of variants, the best known of which is ragù guardaporta (doorman's ragù).

Neapolitan ragù has many similarities with, and is ancestral to, the Italian-American "Sunday gravy", the primary difference being the addition of a greater variety of meat in the American version, most famously meatballs (whence spaghetti and meatballs), braciole, sausage, and pork chops.

References

Italian sauces
Tomato sauces
Neapolitan cuisine
Meat-based sauces